Denis Martin (1920 – October 1988) was a Northern Irish singer, actor and theatre producer active in the 1940s to 1980s.

Martin won the All-Ireland tenor competition at Feis Ceoil in 1944, He then moved to England where he performed as a singer in musical shows and in radio and TV broadcasts. Soon after arriving in England Denis joined the Players' Theatre, a permanent music-hall company in London. In 1949 he played the juvenile lead in King's Rhapsody with Ivor Novello. He went on the become the Director of Production at the Players' Theatre, developing and adapting plays for musical theatre.

Denis's brother Brendan joined him in London as a professional singer at the Windmill Theatre.

Discography

Albums

 Songs of the Emerald Isle (1969)

Singles

 Galway Bay / Terence's Farewell (1948)
 Eileen Oge / Sing Sweet Nightingale (1948)
 Come Back Paddy Reilly / The Last Mile Home (1949)

Stage and screen

Film and television roles

 These Wonderful Shows
 Music for You
 Tonight's the Night (1954)
 Here and Now (TV) (1955)
 The Bamboo Prison (film) (1954)
 Happy Ever After (1954)
 The Good Old Days (TV) (1969 - 1971)

Radio 

 Yuletide in the Music-Hall A Christmas Box at the Players' Theatre; BBC Radio 4, 25 December 1969

Theatre roles

 The Duenna
 Pacific 1860 (1946)
 Tuppence Coloured (1947)
 Oranges and Lemons (1947)
 King's Rhapsody (1949)
 The Punch Revue (1955)

As producer

 A Little of What you Fancy (1968)

References

External links 

 
 
 Denis Martin at Theatricalia.com

20th-century male singers from Northern Ireland
1920 births
1988 deaths
Musicians from Belfast
20th-century male actors from Northern Ireland